Khant Zin Ko (born on 9 September 1985), better known as J-Me, is a Burmese hip hop singer and rapper who began his musical career in the 2000s. He has been dubbed as the "Myanmar's Underground Hip Hop Legend" for his hip hop works and successful music career.

Career 
J-Me began his career in 2000. Around the age of 13 to 18, he attended frequent rap group shows held in parks, including Myaw Sin Kyun in Kandawgyi Lake. He featured alongside rapper Ye Lay and began rising to fame. His first hit song "Burn Em' Up" caused him to gain popularity. His subsequent hit song "Hallelujah" is known as one of his most popular rap songs.

Influence 
J-Me has been rapping and beat-boxing for almost 10 years.  He has tread carefully with his lyrics, and avoids directly criticizing the government in his lyrics.  In addition to his work in the pop-culture field, his older sister used to break dance back in the 1990s. It was through her that J-Me first heard hip hop in the 1990s, when they would both listen to her MC Hammer and Vanilla Ice records.  J-Me, Zayar Thaw, and other members of Myanmar's first hip-hop group, Acid, have been considered inspirational because of their social activism– marrying traditionally Western hip-hop beats with issues close to the hearts of people in Myanmar.

Notable work 
He became one of the leaders of the growing underground subculture of Myanmar, including graffiti artists and political activists. One of J-Me's English-language songs, titled "Burn 'Em Up", gives a shout-out not only to US artists Fabolous, Ryan Leslie and Nas but also to the city of Bangkok, a growing centre in Southeast Asia that promotes international hip-hop.

Departure and comeback 
In 2014, J-Me took a break form the hip hop scene.  He was struggling with addiction and cycling through relapses and rehab.  In an interview with the Myanmar Times in 2018, J-Me, then 33, discussed his absence and changes in his lifestyle.  During his retreat, he had given up using, drinking, and smoking, and became an born-again Christian.

J-Me's album A Mwe Sar A Mwe Khan, which means "Inheritance", is about his personal story and transformation. It was produced by Sun Music Production and released across Myanmar on 26 May 2018.

Other work 
In addition to his music career, J-Me has produced films and  worked as a columnist for the Myanmar Times, a job he began in 2013 and held for several years.

SEA Games 
One of his songs, "Born to Win", was chosen as the anthem for Myanmar athletes at the 2013 Southeast Asian Games, held in Myanmar on 22 December 2013. The song, performed with the singer Zara Hnin Thwin on vocals, has J-Me rapping about "persistence" in a dedication to the young athletes and their fans.

Personal life 
He is the son of Aung Ko Latt, a film director, and a half-Irish mother, J-Me married Jungmaw Mary on 7 September 2011. In an interview with Myanmore in 2015, J-Me identified himself as a non-practicing Catholic, but rediscovered his faith after attending sermons by Saw David Lah.

Discography

Single albums 
Ko Bawa Nae Ko  (2007)
Bawa Ye Neibban  (2012)
 A Mwe Sar A Mwe Khan  (2018)

See also 
 Burmese hip hop

References

External links 
 

1985 births
21st-century Burmese male singers
Burmese people of Irish descent
Burmese hip hop musicians
Burmese rappers
Burmese Roman Catholics
Living people
People from Yangon